Socius is a peer-reviewed open access academic journal that covers research in sociology. It is published by SAGE Publishing on behalf of the American Sociological Association.

Abstracting and indexing
The journal is abstracted and indexed in Scopus.

References

External links

Publications established in 2015
English-language journals
Sociology journals
Creative Commons Attribution-licensed journals
American Sociological Association academic journals
SAGE Publishing academic journals